The Division of Barton is an Australian electoral division in the state of New South Wales.

History

The division was created in 1922 and is named for Sir Edmund Barton, the first Prime Minister of Australia. For most of its history, Barton has been a marginal seat. Although it was held by the Australian Labor Party for most of the time after 1940, it has been won by the Liberals (or their predecessors) at "high-tide" elections.

Barton's most prominent member has been Dr H. V. Evatt, who was Leader of the Labor Party between 1951 and 1960. After seeing his majority more than halved in 1949, and nearly being defeated in 1951 and 1955, he transferred to the safe seat of Hunter in 1958. A former minister in the Hawke and Keating ministries, Gary Punch, held the seat for Labor between 1983 and 1996. Robert McClelland, Attorney-General in the Rudd and Gillard governments, held the seat for Labor between 1996 and 2013.

The Division of Barton is linked to one of the more unusual episodes in Australian politics. The first member for Barton, Labor's Frederick McDonald, disappeared after his 1925 defeat by Nationalist Thomas Ley, and it is now believed that Ley had him murdered. After being found guilty of an unrelated murder in England in 1947, Ley was declared insane and died in Broadmoor Asylum four months later.

Nickolas Varvaris won the seat for the Liberals at the 2013 federal election, achieving a swing of 7.2 percent to finish with a two-party-preferred vote of just 50.3 percent, which made Barton the Coalition government's most marginal seat.

A redistribution prior to the 2016 federal election erased Varvaris' majority and gave Labor a notional vote of 54.4 percent. It was only after some sustained pressure that in May 2016, Varvaris eventually declared his intention to stand again. Former state deputy opposition leader Linda Burney contested the seat for Labor and won on a swing of 3.9 percent, making it a fairly safe Labor seat.

Boundaries
Since 1984, federal electoral division boundaries in Australia have been determined at redistributions by a redistribution committee appointed by the Australian Electoral Commission. Redistributions occur for the boundaries of divisions in a particular state, and they occur every seven years, or sooner if a state's representation entitlement changes or when divisions of a state are malapportioned.

The division has always been based in the inner southern suburbs of Sydney, and currently includes the suburbs of Arncliffe, Banksia, Bardwell Park, Bardwell Valley, Bexley, Bexley North, Brighton-Le-Sands, Clemton Park, Earlwood, Kyeemagh, Rockdale, Tempe, Turrella, Undercliffe, and Wolli Creek; as well as parts of Belmore, Beverly Hills, Campsie, Canterbury, Carlton, Dulwich Hill, Hurlstone Park, Hurstville, Kingsgrove, Kogarah, Marrickville, and Penshurst.

Members

Election results

References

External links
 Division of Barton - Australian Electoral Commission

Electoral divisions of Australia
Constituencies established in 1922
1922 establishments in Australia